Brad Alan Lewis (born November 9, 1954 in Los Angeles, California) is an American competition rower and an Olympic Games gold medalist.

Olympian
Lewis qualified for the 1980 U.S. Olympic team but did not compete due to the U.S. Olympic Committee's boycott of the 1980 Summer Olympics in Moscow, Russia. He was one of 461 athletes to receive a Congressional Gold Medal many years later. He and his rowing partner Paul Enquist won the gold medal in the double sculls at the 1984 Los Angeles Olympic Games. They were the first American rowing crew to win a gold medal in any event since 1964. He also writes books, including an account of his 13-year Olympic gold medal effort: OLYMPIAN.

References

External links 
 Brad Alan Lewis' personal website

Olympic gold medalists for the United States in rowing
American male rowers
Rowers at the 1984 Summer Olympics
1954 births
Living people
Medalists at the 1984 Summer Olympics
Congressional Gold Medal recipients